The National University of Tres de Febrero is an Argentine national university.

Graduate study programs
Bachelor's degree in business administration
Bachelor's degree in social politics administration and management
Bachelor's degree in public administration
Bachelor's degree in foreign trade relationships
Bachelor's degree in art and cultural management
Bachelor's degree in statistics
Bachelor's degree in work safety and hygiene
Bachelor's degree in nursing
Bachelor's degree in psychomotricity
Bachelor's degree in history
Bachelor's degree in geography
Bachelor's degree in electronic arts
Bachelor's degree in music
Bachelor's degree in sport management
Bachelor's degree in geographic information systems
Computer engineering
Audio engineering
Environmental engineering

See also
Argentine Universities

External links

UNTREF STUDENT GUIDE
Science and Education in Argentina
Argentine Higher Education Official Site

Tres de Febrero
Universities in Buenos Aires Province